Newton City-County Airport  is three miles east of Newton, in Harvey County, Kansas. It is owned by the City of Newton and Harvey County.

History 
This establishment was created during World War 2 as a flight training facility for the U.S. Navy. After WW2 ended, it was changed into an airport. It is mostly used as a transport facility now. Also, the FAA's National Plan of Integrated Airport Systems for 2011–2015 categorized it as a reliever airport for Wichita Mid-Continent Airport.

Facilities
It has two asphalt runways: runway 17/35 is 7,003 by 100 feet (2,135 x 30 m) and 8/26 is 3,501 by 60 feet (1,067 x 18 m).

The Hesston College aviation program operates out of Hangar K.

In the year ending June 10, 2008 the airport had 65,044 aircraft operations, average 178 per day: 99% general aviation, 1% air taxi, and <1% military. 99 aircraft were then based at the airport: 77% single-engine, 13% multi-engine, 7% jet, 2% helicopter and 1% ultralight.

References

External links 
 Newton City-County Airport at City of Newton website
   from Kansas DOT Airport Directory
 Aerial photo as of 1 October 1991 from USGS The National Map
 

Airports in Kansas
Buildings and structures in Harvey County, Kansas